Nagyvarsány is a village in Szabolcs-Szatmár-Bereg county, in the Northern Great Plain region of eastern Hungary.

Jews lived in Nagyvarsány for many years until they were murdered in the Holocaust. There is still a Jewish cemetery in the village.

Geography

References

Populated places in Szabolcs-Szatmár-Bereg County
Jewish communities destroyed in the Holocaust